The Folda (or Folla) is a river in Møre og Romsdal and Trøndelag counties in Norway. It has its source in the Trollheimen mountains on the border of the municipality of Surnadal in Møre og Romsdal county and the municipality of Oppdal in Trøndelag county. The river heads northwards and, for a time, it forms the border between Møre og Romsdal and Trøndelag counties. Two reservoirs lie along the course of the river: Lake Fold ( or Follsjø) and Gray Lake. The name of the river comes from Old Norse Fold, probably meaning 'the broad one'.

See also
List of rivers in Norway

References

Rivers of Møre og Romsdal
Rivers of Trøndelag
Surnadal
Rindal
Rivers of Norway